Cathy Silvers (born May 27, 1961) is an American actress and author. She is the daughter of actress Evelyn Patrick and actor/comedian Phil Silvers. She is best known for her role as boy-crazy teenager Jenny Piccolo in later seasons of the TV sitcom Happy Days. She was a member of the cast of the 1985–86 sitcom Foley Square. She also provided the voice of Marie Dodo, Big Bird's adoptive sister, in Sesame Street Presents: Follow That Bird.

As of August 2002, she was an announcer for the TV series SoapTalk on the cable station SoapNet.

She is the author of the 2007 book Happy Days Healthy Living.

Early life 
Silvers was born in New York City, the daughter of actors Phil Silvers and Evelyn Patrick. She has a twin sister, Candace Silvers, and three other sisters: Nancey Silvers, Tracey Silvers and Laurie Silvers. She graduated in the class of 1978 from Beverly Hills High School.

Personal life 
Her father was television comedy star Phil Silvers, who was best known as Sgt. Bilko, the title character of The Phil Silvers Show

Silvers was married to doctor Alexander Burnett in August 1988 and had two children with him. They divorced in 1996. She married entertainment lawyer David Fullmer in 2001 and had two children with him and also raised a stepchild.

Silvers earned a degree in marketing from American University. She parlayed her education into forming her own business after she was done acting in Hollywood. A vegan, she operates a delivery service that delivers organic produce from farmers’ markets to customers throughout Los Angeles County.

Filmography

Works

References

External links

1961 births
Living people
Actresses from New York City
American television actresses
American people of Russian-Jewish descent
20th-century American actresses
American Latter Day Saints
21st-century American women